Patrick Maher ( – 7 June 1921) was a member of the Irish Republican Army executed in Mountjoy Prison. He was 32 years old at the time of his death.

Background
A native of County Limerick, Maher was hanged along with Edmond Foley for his alleged involvement in the rescue of Seán Hogan at Knocklong Railway Station on 13 May 1919 in which two Royal Irish Constabulary (RIC) officers were killed.

Trial and Execution
Unlike Foley, Maher had no direct involvement in the rescue. He merely worked at the station grading poultry and eggs and he was at a crossroads three miles away at the time of the ambush. Maher strongly protested his innocence. Two civilian juries failed to reach a verdict. He was finally convicted of involvement by a military court-martial and sentenced to death.

In a final message to other members of the IRA, Foley and Maher wrote:

Reinterment
Maher is one of a group of men hanged and buried in Mountjoy in the period 1920–21, commonly referred to as The Forgotten Ten. In 2001 Maher and the other nine, including Kevin Barry, were exhumed and given a full State funeral. He is the only one of the Ten not to be buried in Glasnevin Cemetery, Dublin. In accordance with his wishes and those of his family, he is buried at Ladywell Graveyard in Ballylanders, County Limerick.

References

External links 
 

1880s births
1921 deaths
20th-century executions by the United Kingdom
Burials at Glasnevin Cemetery
Executed Irish people
Irish people convicted of murdering police officers
Irish Republican Army (1919–1922) members
Irish Republicans killed during the Irish War of Independence
People executed by the British military by hanging
People from County Limerick